Demetris Daskalakis (born November 18, 1977 in Greece) is a Greek football defender who last played for Ergotelis. He also played for the national team of Cyprus. He had been a part of APOEL for eight years and won three championships (2002, 2004, 2007), two cups (2006, 2008) and two Super cups (2002, 2004). He was signed by AEK Larnaca on  June 4, 2008. He then moved to Ethnikos Asteras and later returned to Cyprus to play for Olympiakos Nicosia. He has been reported to have been linked with a number of high-profile clubs, including Partizan Belgrade and Manchester City; however, there has been no reported interest from either.

External links
 

Living people
1977 births
Ethnikos Assia FC players
Olympiakos Nicosia players
AEK Larnaca FC players
APOEL FC players
Ethnikos Asteras F.C. players
Ergotelis F.C. players
Cypriot footballers
Cyprus international footballers
Cypriot expatriate footballers
Expatriate footballers in Greece
Cypriot expatriates in Greece
Association football defenders
Footballers from Athens
Greek footballers
Ethnikos Latsion FC players